is a Japanese racing driver.

Career

Karting
Sasahara began karting aged seven in 2003. He won numerous domestic titles, including becoming JAF All Japan Championship Junior Champion in 2009. In the same year, he beat Matt Parry to win the Rotax Max Challenge Junior Grand Final, a title he went on to win for a second time in 2011. He went on to enjoy further success in the category, winning the Rotax Max Euro Challenge Junior title in 2011, and the Central Eastern European Rotax Max Challenge Senior title in 2012, his final year in karting.

Formula Renault 2.0
Sasahara graduated to single-seaters in 2013, racing in the Formula Renault 2.0 Alps championship for Vincenzo Sospiri's Euronova Racing team. He finished in the points on seven occasions, taking a best race result of sixth at Misano to finish 13th in the championship. During the season, he also took part in the Spa-Francorchamps and Barcelona rounds of the Eurocup Formula Renault 2.0 season with Euronova Racing as a guest driver.

For 2014, Sasahara continued with Euronova Racing, switching to the Formula Renault 2.0 NEC championship. He took a single podium position, finishing second to Louis Delétraz in the opening race of the season at Monza, and finished in the points in all the remaining races except one to finish sixth in the championship.

In 2015, Sasahara joined the ART Junior Team to contest both the Eurocup Formula Renault 2.0 and Formula Renault 2.0 NEC championships. After failing to score points in the opening round of the Eurocup at Motorland Aragón, Sasahara took his first race victory in the following round at Spa-Francorchamps, becoming only the second Japanese driver to win a Eurocup race after Kamui Kobayashi in the 2005 season.

In the NEC championship, Sasahara won the opening race of the season at Monza ahead of Manor MP Motorsport's Ignazio D'Agosto.

Italian F4
In June 2014, Sasahara took part in the opening round of the Italian F4 Championship at Adria International Raceway for Euronova Racing, replacing Italian driver Andrea Fontana who missed the event due to illness. After finishing fifth in the opening race, he won the reversed-grid second race ahead of the Prema Powerteam entry of eventual series champion Lance Stroll.

Racing record

Career summary

† As Sasahara was a guest driver, he was ineligible for championship points.

Complete FIA Formula 3 European Championship results
(key)

Complete Super GT results
(key) (Races in bold indicate pole position) (Races in italics indicate fastest lap)

‡ Half points awarded as less than 75% of race distance was completed.

Complete Super Formula results
(key) (Races in bold indicate pole position) (Races in italics indicate fastest lap)

References

External links
 
 
 

1996 births
Living people
People from Gunma Prefecture
Japanese racing drivers
Italian F4 Championship drivers
Formula Renault Eurocup drivers
Formula Renault 2.0 Alps drivers
Formula Renault 2.0 NEC drivers
FIA Formula 3 European Championship drivers
F3 Asian Championship drivers
FIA Motorsport Games drivers
Japanese Formula 3 Championship drivers
Super Formula drivers
Super GT drivers
Euronova Racing drivers
Fortec Motorsport drivers
Hitech Grand Prix drivers
Motopark Academy drivers
Mugen Motorsports drivers
Dandelion Racing drivers
T-Sport drivers
R-ace GP drivers
ART Grand Prix drivers
Japanese F4 Championship drivers
B-Max Racing drivers